Soejima is a Japanese surname. Notable people with the surname include:

, Japanese footballer and manager
Kameli Soejima (born 1983), Fijian-born Japanese rugby union player
, Japanese Paralympic wheelchair racer
, Japanese video game and anime character designer
, Japanese diplomat and statesman

See also
8274 Soejima, a main-belt asteroid

Japanese-language surnames